The Campbellton Tigers are a Junior "A" ice hockey team based in Campbellton, New Brunswick.  They play in the Maritime Junior A Hockey League.  The team plays their home games at the Memorial Civic Center.

Originally founded in 1996 as the Restigouche River Rats the team was relocated two years later in Campbellton and rebranded as the Tigers.  In 2005 the team returned to Restigouche for another three-year period before making the move back to Campbellton were they continue with their franchise to-date.

The Tigers have won league championships in 1998 and 2004.

Season-by-season record

External links
Tigers' Webpage
MJAHL Web Site

See also
List of ice hockey teams in New Brunswick
Maritime Junior A Hockey League

Campbellton, New Brunswick
Ice hockey teams in New Brunswick
Maritime Junior Hockey League teams
1996 establishments in New Brunswick
New Brunswick Sports Hall of Fame inductees